Federico de Castro y Bravo (21 October 1903 in Seville – 1983 in Madrid) was a Spanish jurist. He served as a judge on the International Court of Justice from 1970 until 1979.

References

20th-century Spanish judges
International Court of Justice judges
Commanders Crosses of the Order of Merit of the Federal Republic of Germany
1903 births
1983 deaths
Spanish judges of United Nations courts and tribunals